Sampov Lun is a khum (commune) of Sampov Loun District in Battambang Province in northwest Cambodia.

Villages

 Thnal Bat
 Thnal Bambaek
 Kaoh Touch
 Tuol Chrey

References

Communes of Battambang province
Sampov Loun District